The 1982 Ethiopian–Somali Border War occurred between June and August 1982 when Ethiopia, sending a 10,000 man invasion force backed by warplanes and armored units, supported by thousands of SSDF rebels invaded Central Somalia. The United States government responded by speeding up deliveries of light arms and Pattons already promised. In addition, the initially pledged US$45 million in economic and military aid was increased to US$80 million.

Background 
Ethiopia, which lies just to the west of Somalia, has been reported as being neighbors with Somalia as early as the 5th century BC. Relations between Somalia and Ethiopia began as colonial competitors in the eighteenth century. During this time period, territories between the countries were constructed with much debate over which country was the sole owner. This contention culminated in a settlement where Ethiopia gave Somalia a southern strip colonized by Britain yet was granted the controversial and prized Somali region Ogaden. Between the early 19th century and World War II the boundaries of the two countries were constantly disputed, leading to the intervention from the United Nations after the war. The United Nations decided to revert to the colonial boundaries agreement made in the late eighteenth century. Thus enacting the boundary to the previous owner (Ethiopia), due to the agreement being the only recorded settlement between Somalia and Ethiopia.

In 1969, through a military coup following the assassination of the former president Abdirashid Ali Shermarke, Commander Mohamed Siad Barre took power of Somalia. Siad Barre, a self-proclaimed Marxist, quickly aligned himself with the Soviet Union. Siad Barre prioritized party supremacy and created a dictatorship government. In 1977, Somalia attempted to regain control of Ogaden with the support of the Soviet Union. But by 1978 the Soviet Union had switched its allegiance to Ethiopia due to the potential political gain and potential resources. In 1978, backed with Soviet weaponry and Cuban reinforcements, Ethiopia regained control of Ogaden. This resulted in the mass exodus of hundreds of thousands of Somali men and women immigrating from the Ogaden region to the Somali borders. Somalia, despite losing the 1977-78 war, never recognized the international border that places the Ogaden, with its ethnic Somali population, in Ethiopia. This reason, many historians believe is what kept the hate between the two countries.

Following the Soviet Union's change of allegiance from Somalia to Ethiopia in 1978, the United States became reluctant allies to Somalia. America came in the 12th hour when Somalia seemingly had no other allies left. America originally was aligned with Ethiopia but stopped supplying and equipping the country with support and aid. The United States originally thought that in the long term Ethiopia would be a more valuable ally due to its geographical position, its size and influence. Yet both Somalia and Ethiopia were in close proximity to western oil routes, which peaked both of the United States and the Soviet Union's stake in Africa. Both the United States and the Soviet Union had military accord with the separate alliances to their respective countries. America had access to ports and airstrips, while the Soviet Union had military posts scattered throughout Ethiopia by the Red Sea. The extensive and continued involvement of the United States and the Soviet Union in the Horn of Africa was a tribute to the game of chess called the Cold War.

Due to Siad Barre's human rights abuses, the United States was only comfortable with sending light weapons for defense rather than for attack. John E. Pike writes  “although the United States was prepared to help the Siad Barre regime economically through direct grants, World Bank-sponsored loans, and relaxed International Monetary Fund regulations, the United States hesitated to offer Somalia more military aid than was essential to maintain internal security. The amount of United States military and economic aid to the regime was US$34 million.”

Border war 
After President Siad Barre visited the United States in early February 1982, only months later did the assault on Somalia's border began. In the middle of July the SSDF (Somalia Salvation Democratic Front also known as Democratic Front for Salvation of Somalia), a paramilitary umbrella organization created after Siad Barre's reign as dictator began, and Ethiopia armed with Soviet military weapons and machines crossed over the disputed Ogaden region into the Mudug region of Somalia. The Mudug region, located in central Somalia, was the point of attack as any conflict there would threaten to split the country into two halves.  The Ethiopians came armed with Soviet-supplied MIG fighters and T-55 tanks. The estimated the size of the Ethiopian force was at 10,000 men, while the Somali army was estimated to be around fifty thousand by Western diplomatic sources at the beginning of the campaign. Despite the difference  in army size, the Somalis were extremely unprepared as they were not very well equipped. Upon entering the country, the Ethiopian army were able to capture Balanbale and Galdogob. Balanbale and Galdogob were two towns near the capital of the Mudug region, Galcaio. After the successful seizure of Balanbale and Galdogob, Siad Barre and his government declared a state of emergency. The regime fearful of the country becoming a war zone, pleaded for western help. The United States delivered arms which had been previously offered due to their previously existing allegiance. The weaponry was sent with rules stating that the guns should be used to repel invasion but not to attack in revenge. Along with the weapons, the United States also supplied Somalia with economic and military aid totalling over one hundred and twenty five million dollars. In addition, the initially pledged US$45 million in economic and military aid was increased to US$80 million. The new arms were not used to repel the Ethiopians, however, but to repress Siad Barre's domestic opponents.

Aftermath 
After the Ethiopians invaded Somalia, many diplomats believed that Somalis would welcome the Ethiopians as liberators due to the human rights abuses of President Siad Barre's government. Yet the historical dislike between the two countries proved too much for there to be a welcome for the Ethiopians. In the years following the border war, President Siad Barre gained support after speaking at a summit hosted by the League of Arab States. But ultimately year after year Somalia was challenged by war and economic trouble. Newly formed regional clan and guerilla groups revolted and challenged the Siad Barre government. Siad Barre's regime was also pressured economically by the International Monetary Fund, the United Nations Development Programme, and the World Bank to liberalize its economy. The economic system pressured Somalia to exercise the free market system, so that its currency would reflect its true value. Due to constant political pressure, Somalia became engulfed in a full scale civil war by 1988. The forever escalating and intense civil war resulted in Somalia's disruption. This collapse of Somalia was in the words of the Conciliation Resource “hastened by the ending of the Cold War. As Somalia's strategic importance to the West declined, the foreign aid that had sustained the state was withdrawn. Without the resources needed to maintain the system of patronage politics, Barre lost control of the country and the army. In January 1991 he was ousted from Mogadishu by forces of the United Somali Congress (USC) drawing support from the Hawiye clans in south central Somalia.”

References

17.Ethiopia-Somali: Continuing Military Imbalance in the Ogaden. (1983). Retrieved January 30, 2020

External links 
CIA info
Laitin Research
Ethiopia The Somali - Flags, Maps, Economy, History, Climate, Natural Resources, Current Issues, International Agreements, Population, Social Statistics, Political System
Ethiopia's Invasion of Somalia, 1982–83. Ministry of Foreign Affairs, Somali Democratic Republic, 1983 - 48 páginas (Somebody knows the link of this article).

Ethiopian-Somali Border War, 1982
Ethiopian-Somali Border War, 1982
Ethiopian–Somali Border War 
Territorial disputes of Ethiopia
Territorial disputes of Somalia
Wars involving Ethiopia
Wars involving Somalia
Ethiopia–Somalia border
Ethiopian Civil War
Ethiopia–Somalia military relations
Proxy wars
Ethiopian–Somali Border War 
Ethiopian–Somali Border War 
Ethiopian–Somali Border War 
Wars involving the United States